MCRPC may refer to :
 Mercer County Regional Planning Commission
 Mid-Coast Regional Planning Commission (Maine)

mCRPC usually refers to metastatic castration-resistant prostate cancer